Raymond Emile Poole (born July 4, 1965) better known by his stage name Mo B. Dick is an American rapper, singer, and music producer. He is a founding member of the production team the Medicine Men (formerly Beats by the Pound), which produced most of No Limit Records' releases from 1995 to 1999. During his stint at No Limit Records, he not only produced tracks, but was also a featured artist on over a dozen songs, As a  member of Beats by the Pound, the production team collectively produced nearly all of the label's tracks. Mo B. Dick's own repertoire lists his production credits on over 170 recordings and has his own record label Out The Box Xploitations. Currently Mo B. Dick is working on projects for his new imprints, Out The Box Xploitations & OnHer and iNHer iNHerTainment, 8Ball and MJG, Mystikal, Tha Dogg Pound, T.I., Fiend, Gangsta Boo, OJ Da Juiceman,  Frayser Boy, DJ Burn One and the Five Points Bakery, and producing songs for various movie soundtracks, TV shows, and video games.

Early life
All through high school he was in honors, state, district, parish, etc. He went on to college and marched in Southern University Band until he was kicked out for fighting. Earlier on, he taught himself how to play piano, later was hired by several churches in the Tri-City (Morgan City, Berwick, snd Patterson, Louisiana) area, and later by St. Mark United Methodist Church where he was the Youth Music Minister in Wichita, Kansas.
Music production started for him in 1988. At that time, he was attending Nicholls State University in Thibodaux, Louisiana for marketing, where he was initiated into the Eta Theta Chapter of Kappa Kappa Psi.

His first sampling loop machine was a Teac dual cassette recorder/player. The first drum machine he made a beat on was the Roland 606.

He is also a founding member of The Mu Nu Nu Chapter of Omega Psi Phi.

Music career

1995–99: No Limit, Beats by the Pound and Gangsta Harmony
In the mid-1990s Mo B. Dick signed as an artist to his cousin Master P's label No Limit Records and also joined as a member in the production team Beats by the Pound. On April 13, 1999, Mo B. Dick would release his debut album, Gangsta Harmony; the album peaked at No. 66 on the Billboard 200 and No. 16 on the Top R&B/Hip-Hop Albums charts. Also in 1999, along with Beats by the Pound's lead producers, Mo B. Dick, KLC, Craig B and Odell, disbanded from No Limit Records and changed their name to The Medicine Men and record label Overdose Entertainment.

2009–14: Perverted XXXcursions and li se Sa li yE
After taking a break from his music career to focus on producing, on January 13, 2009 Mo B. Dick released his second album in over 10 years, entitled Perverted XXXcursions. 
On April 1, 2014, Mo B. Dick released his third album, entitled li se Sa li yE via his label OTBX, LLC.

2016: #MoBDick – EP
Album came out January 29, 2016. Released single and video "All I Think About Is Git'n Money".

2019: Pseudocryptosexual, Flambeaux and The iNeffable
Releases three more mp3 albums: Pseudocryptosexual, Flambeaux and The ineffable.

2021: Unapologetically 
February 12, 2021 Releases mp3 album : Unapologetically

2022: Unapologetically • 432 Hz 
September 2, 2022 Releases mp3 album : Unapologetically • 432 Hz

2022: Play The Game How It Geaux: The Beatstrumentals 
July 15, 2022 Releases mp3 album : Play The Game How It Geaux: The Beatstrumentals

2022: Play The Game How It Geaux: The Beatstrumentals • 432 Hz 
September 9, 2022 Releases mp3 album : Play The Game How It Geaux: The Beatstrumentals • 432 Hz

2023: The Mo B. Dickapedia: Life, Language, & Lyrics 
February 2, 2023 Releases 1st Book : The Mo B. Dickapedia: Life, Language, & Lyrics

Discography

Studio albums
 Gangsta Harmony (1999)
Perverted XXXcursions (2009)
li se Sa li yE (2014)
Pseudocryptosexual (2019)
Unapologetically (2021)
Unapologetically • 432 Hz (2022)

Extended plays
#MoBDick (2016)
The iNeffable (2019)
Play The Game How It Geaux: The Beatstrumentals (2022)
Play The Game How It Geaux: The Beatstrumentals • 432 Hz (2022)

See also
No Limit Records discography

References

External links
Raymond E. Poole BMI Repertoire
Album Credits on Allmusic.com
The Mo B. Dickapedia on Amazon
The Mo B. Dickapedia on Barnes & Nobles

Hip hop record producers
No Limit Records artists
Musicians from New Orleans
American hip hop record producers
Living people
1965 births
Singers from Louisiana
21st-century African-American male singers
20th-century African-American male singers